Fribourg/Freiburg railway station serves the municipality of Fribourg, capital of the canton of Fribourg, Switzerland.  Opened in 1862, it is owned and operated by SBB-CFF-FFS.

The station forms part of the Lausanne–Bern railway, which is the original portion of the Olten–Lausanne railway line. It is also the junction for the Yverdon-les-Bains–Payerne–Fribourg railway, and the Fribourg–Ins railway.

Location
Fribourg railway station is right in the heart of the city centre, which has shifted from the Old City to the railway station quarter since the station's construction.

History
The station was opened on 20 August 1862 by the Western Swiss Railways, upon completion of the Fribourg–Bern section of the Lausanne–Bern railway.

On 2 September 1862, the remaining section of the line was opened between Lausanne and Fribourg.

The first station building at Fribourg was a simple wooden hut.  Between 1872 and 1873, a more substantial replacement building was constructed adjacent to the hut.  The new building's design had been entrusted to the architect Adolphe Fraisse.

Initially, the army had not wanted the Lausanne–Bern railway to pass through Fribourg. The military had believed that the line would be too "vulnerable" in case of conflict. The government and the city had to fight for the route and the station. By 1905, the authorities wanted a new station building, which was completed in 1928.

On 7 September 2007, the 1872 station building became a cultural centre, incorporating a café, an entertainment hall and two festival theatres, for $4.5 million Swiss francs.  A Swiss heritage site of regional significance (class B), the building houses the Nouveau Monde and its theatre, the International Film Festival of Fribourg and Belluard Bollwerk International.

Services 
 the following services stop at Fribourg:
 RER Fribourg:
  / :
 Weekends: half-hourly service to Ins; S21 trains continue to Romont.

Interchange 
Seven urban bus lines operated by the Transports publics fribourgeois call at the station, including TPF trolleybus lines.

See also

History of rail transport in Switzerland
Rail transport in Switzerland

References

External links

Interactive station plan (Fribourg/Freiburg)

Railway stations in Switzerland opened in 1862
Railway stations in the canton of Fribourg
Swiss Federal Railways stations
Transport in Fribourg